Schiller Rudolph Hyppolite (born May 23, 1986) is a Haitian Canadian former professional boxer who competed from 2011 to 2016.

Early life 

In his youth, Hyppolite practiced several individual and team sports. His behavioral problems meant that he was suspended three times from the basketball team at his high school. At age 16 he practiced kickboxing, but after he injured both legs, he opted for boxing.

Amateur career 

Hyppolite has been crowned champion several times in Quebec.

Professional career 

Hyppolite's professional career started against Patrick Tessier. This fight was on the Bute vs. Magee undercard. His nickname was Batman. He was allocated after his only defeat against Francy Ntetu.

In December 2014, Hyppolite won the vacant WBC International Silver Light Heavyweight title by referee stoppage. It was against Hungarian Norbert Nemesapati.

Professional boxing record

|-
| style="text-align:center;" colspan="8"|21 wins (14 knockouts), 2 losses, 0 draws, 0 no contests
|-  style="text-align:center; background:#e3e3e3;"
|  style="border-style:none none solid solid; "|Res.
|  style="border-style:none none solid solid; "|Record
|  style="border-style:none none solid solid; "|Opponent
|  style="border-style:none none solid solid; "|Type
|  style="border-style:none none solid solid; "|Round
|  style="border-style:none none solid solid; "|Date
|  style="border-style:none none solid solid; "|Location
|  style="border-style:none none solid solid; "|Notes
|- style="text-align:center;"
|Loss
|21-2
|align=left|
|
| 
|
|align=left|
|align=left|
|- style="text-align:center;"
|Win
|21-1
|align=left|
|
| 
|
|align=left|
|align=left|
|- style="text-align:center;"
|Win
|20-1
|align=left|
|
| 
|
|align=left|
|align=left|
|- style="text-align:center;"
|Win
|19-1
|align=left|
|
|
|
|align=left|
|align=left|
|- style="text-align:center;"
|Win
|18-1
|align=left|
|
|
|
|align=left|
|align=left|
|- style="text-align:center;"
|Win
|17-1
|align=left|
|
|
|
|align=left|
|align=left|
|- style="text-align:center;"
|Win
|16-1
|align=left|
|
|
|
|align=left|
|align=left|
|- style="text-align:center;"
|Win
|15-1
|align=left|
|
|
|
|align=left|
|align=left|
|- style="text-align:center;"
|Win
|14-1
|align=left|
|
|
|
|align=left|
|align=left|
|- style="text-align:center;"
|Win
|13-1
|align=left|
|
|
|
|align=left|
|align=left|
|- style="text-align:center;"
|Win
|12-1
|align=left|
|
|
|
|align=left|
|align=left|
|- style="text-align:center;"
|Win
|11-1
|align=left|
|
|
|
|align=left|
|align=left|
|- style="text-align:center;"
|Win
|10-1
|align=left|
|
|
|
|align=left|
|align=left|
|- style="text-align:center;"
|Win
|9-1
|align=left|
|
|
|
|align=left|
|align=left|
|- style="text-align:center;"
|Win
|8-1
|align=left|
|
|
|
|align=left|
|align=left|
|- style="text-align:center;"
|Win
|7-1
|align=left|
|
|
|
|align=left|
|align=left|
|- style="text-align:center;"
|Win
|6-1
|align=left|
|
|
|
|align=left|
|align=left|
|- style="text-align:center;"
|Loss
|5-1
|align=left|
|
|
|
|align=left|
|align=left|
|- style="text-align:center;"
|Win
|5-0
|align=left|
|
|
|
|align=left|
|align=left|
|- style="text-align:center;"
|Win
|4-0
|align=left|
|
|
|
|align=left|
|align=left|
|- style="text-align:center;"
|Win
|3-0
|align=left|
|
|
|
|align=left|
|align=left|
|- style="text-align:center;"
|Win
|2-0
|align=left|
|
|
|
|align=left|
|align=left|
|- style="text-align:center;"
|Win
|1-0
|align=left|
|
|
|
|align=left|
|align=left|

References

External links

1986 births
Living people
Haitian emigrants to Canada
Canadian male boxers
Haitian Quebecers
Black Canadian boxers
Super-middleweight boxers